Kirby Lauryen Dockery, also known by the stage names Kirby (stylized as KIRBY) and Kirby Lauryen, is an American singer-songwriter. She has written pop songs such as "FourFiveSeconds" performed by Rihanna, Kanye West, and Paul McCartney. Kirby is an independent artist and released her first album, Sis, in 2020.

Life and career
Dockery was born October 24 in Memphis, Tennessee and raised in Southaven, Mississippi. She studied music at Stax Music Academy, and enrolled at Berklee College of Music after high school but left in 2012 to pursue music full-time. She was influenced by Kanye West's The College Dropout.

She began a YouTube challenge where she posted videos of herself singing a new original song for 275 days. She was contacted by Joy Brown of Roc Nation on day 302 of the challenge and signed to the label.

She has worked with artists such as Jennifer Lopez, Brandy, and Timbaland. Kirby co-wrote the track "FourFiveSeconds", which went through several rounds of edits as directed by Kanye West. She also wrote the song "Die with You" performed by Beyoncé and "Break Your Heart Right Back" by Ariana Grande.

She released her first album, Sis, in February 2020. Robyn Mowatt of Okayplayer referred to it as "a mashup of refreshing deep cuts." Two singles from the album were featured on the soundtrack for the fourth season of Insecure.

In June 2020, Kirby posted a viral TikTok video about the racist origins of the pancake brand Aunt Jemima, and amid other online critiques taking place, the brand announced that they would retire the racist imagery.

Discography

Studio albums
Sis. (2020)

Singles

Songwriting credits
 indicates a credited vocal/featured artist contribution

References

External links 
 Official profile on Roc Nation
 Kirby on Allmusic
 Kirby on Discogs

Year of birth missing (living people)
Living people
21st-century American singers
Singer-songwriters from Mississippi
Singer-songwriters from Tennessee
African-American women singer-songwriters
American soul singers
American rhythm and blues singers
21st-century African-American women
Songs written by Kirby Lauryen